Friedrich Filitz (16 March 1804 – 8 December 1876) was a German composer and musicologist who collected church music from the 16th and 17th centuries.

Biography
Filitz was born in Arnstadt, County of Schwarzburg-Rudolstadt, in 1804. He received a PhD and lived in Berlin from 1833, working as a music critic among other employment. In 1841, Filitz was shortlisted to be a censor of the Prussian state, although there were concerns he would be too strict. He moved to Munich in 1847, where his legacy of valuable church music is now in the Bavarian State Library. Through his collections of church music from the 16th and 17th, he made many forgotten works available once again.

One of his tunes, Mannheim, is one to which the hymn Lead us, heavenly Father, lead us, with words by English architect and hymn writer James Edmeston, has been set.

Works
Vierstimmiges Choralbuch herausgegeben von Dr F Filitz. Besser, Berlin 1847. .
Ueber einige Interessen der älteren Kirchenmusik. Kaiser, München 1853. .

References

Bibliography

External links 
 

19th-century German composers
1804 births
1876 deaths
People from Arnstadt
19th-century German musicologists